Peter the Pirate, also known in English as The Sea Wolves, is a 1925 German silent historical adventure film directed by Arthur Robison and starring Paul Richter, Aud Egede-Nissen, and Rudolf Klein-Rogge. It was based on a novel by Wilhelm Hegeler. Leni Riefenstahl was offered the role of female lead by producer Erich Pommer, but after doing a screen test she eventually turned it down.

It was shot at the Babelsberg Studios in Berlin. The film's sets were designed by the art director Albin Grau. The film premiered at the Union-Theater.

Cast

References

Bibliography

External links

1925 films
German black-and-white films
Films of the Weimar Republic
German silent feature films
Films directed by Arthur Robison
Films based on German novels
Pirate films
Films produced by Erich Pommer
German historical adventure films
1920s historical adventure films
UFA GmbH films
Films shot at Babelsberg Studios
Silent historical adventure films
1920s German films
1920s German-language films